Kellen Diesch (born August 23, 1997) is an American football offensive tackle for the Chicago Bears of the National Football League (NFL). He played college football at Texas A&M and Arizona State.

Early life
Diesch grew up in Trophy Club, Texas and attended Byron Nelson High School.

College career
Diesch began his college career at Texas A&M and redshirted his true freshman season. He played mostly as a reserve over the next three seasons. Diesch announced he would be leaving the program with the intent to transfer after his redshirt junior year.

Diesch transferred to Arizona State as a graduate transfer. He became a starter in his first season with the Sun Devils. Diesch decided to utilize the extra year of eligibility granted to college athletes who played in the 2020 season due to the coronavirus pandemic and return to Arizona State for a second season. He was named second-team All-Pac-12 Conference in his final season.

Professional career

Miami Dolphins
Diesch was signed by the Miami Dolphins as an undrafted free agent on April 30, 2022, shortly after the conclusion of the 2022 NFL Draft. He was waived on August 30, 2022.

Chicago Bears
On September 1, 2022, Diesch was signed to the Chicago Bears practice squad. He signed a reserve/future contract on January 9, 2023.

References

External links
 Miami Dolphins bio
 Arizona State Sun Devils bio
 Texas A&M Aggies bio

1997 births
Living people
Players of American football from Texas
American football offensive tackles
Texas A&M Aggies football players
Arizona State Sun Devils football players
Miami Dolphins players
Chicago Bears players